Dalma Wildlife Sanctuary is a wildlife sanctuary located 10 km from the city of Jamshedpur in the state of Jharkhand. Inaugurated in 1975 it  contains significant population of Indian Elephants.

Geography 
Dalma Wildlife Sanctuary is situated around the Dalma Hills. Dalma Wildlife Sanctuary is a much larger area starting from Chandil to 40 km east. The sanctuary covers around 195 km2.

It is about 100 km from the capital city Ranchi, and 15 km from the steel city Jamshedpur. The wildlife sanctuary runs parallel to the NH-18 with hills as high as 915 m from sea level. Dalma Sanctuary is spread over 193 km2 of forests of East Singhbhum and Saraikela-kharsawan districts of the state of Jharkhand. The forests of Dalma come under the category "Dry peninsular Sal" and "Northern Dry Mixed Deciduous Forest". Most part of Dalma forests shed leaves in the summer and attains its full bloom at the onset of monsoon.

Flora 
The forest cover is denuded up to 90% because of selective pilferage by timber mafia over many years thereby creating harsh conditions for animal inhabitants here .

Fauna 

The wildlife sanctuary has elephants, barking deer, sloth bear and porcupines as the main inhabitants. Famous for holding many elephants and other animals, which come downhill during the monsoons and winter and enter nearby villages and towns of Jharkhand and West Bengal. This occasionally leads to conflicts between man and elephants.

Beside elephants there are Indian giant squirrel, sloth bear, barking deer, wild boar, porcupine, mouse deer, pangolin and mongooses in the sanctuary. Commonly seen birds in the sanctuary are the falcons, golden oriole, Indian tree pie, paradise fly catchers, grey hornbills, Indian peafowl, different varieties of king fishers, herons, egrets, mynas, pigeons, racket tailed drongo, magpie robins etc.

As per the 2019 census report, The waterhole census carried out in Dalma on May 21 and 22 at 43 waterholes spotted 66 elephants, a clear sign that elephants have once again started considering Dalma as a safe and conducive habitat. The census had found the number of elephants dropping to 48 from 95, as recorded in 2017. The number wild bears has gone up to 19 this year from last year's 13, wild boars to 162 from 152, porcupines to 79 from 63, langurs to 40 from 38, monkeys to 552 from 496, reed squirrels to 45 from 39, peacocks to 120 from 53, rabbits to 24 from 18, snakes to 13 from 4, Jackals to 9 from 3 and jungle fowls going up to 137 this year from 71 last year.

Activities 
There are small hideouts within the sanctuary to view the wild animals in their natural habitat. The sanctuary is an ideal spot for trekkers. Another attraction here is a temple dedicated to Lord Shiva, where a large number of devotees flock during the festival of Shivratri. The number of tourists visiting the sanctuary has significantly dropped in recent years due to the Naxalite activities in the area surrounding the sanctuary and also due to the volatile situation in the region. Recently Country's first Phenocamp started in Dalma Wildlife Sanctuary.

Tourist attractions

• Hanuman Temple
• Shiva Temple
• Pindrabera FRH
• Majhlabandh/Nichlabandh
• Bamboo hut
• Natural Interpretation Center
• Deer Enclosure
• Elephant Rescue Center

Accessibility

See also
 P&M Hi-Tech City Centre Mall
 Tata Steel Zoological Park
 Rankini Temple, Jadugora
 Jubilee Park, Jamshedpur

References

External links 

Chota Nagpur dry deciduous forests
Wildlife sanctuaries in Jharkhand
Jamshedpur
1976 establishments in Bihar
Protected areas established in 1976
Wildlife sanctuaries in West Bengal
Neighbourhoods in Jamshedpur